Mauro Aguirre (born 21 April 1990) is an Argentine footballer currently playing for Deportes Santa Cruz of the Primera B de Chile.

References
 
 
 

1990 births
Living people
Argentine expatriate footballers
Argentine footballers
Deportes Iberia footballers
Coquimbo Unido footballers
Primera B de Chile players
Expatriate footballers in Chile
People from San Luis, Argentina
Association football midfielders